Árnagarður is a building in Reykjavík, Iceland, located on the campus of the University of Iceland.  It is named after the 18th century scholar Árni Magnússon, and houses the Árni Magnússon Institute for Icelandic Studies. 

Most of the building is used for staff offices and classrooms, but it also houses a small cafeteria. The building is used mostly by the University's Faculty of Humanities.

Buildings and structures in Reykjavík
University of Iceland